The Pleasanton Unified School District (PUSD) is a public primary and secondary education school district located in Pleasanton, California, United States, a suburban town east of San Francisco. It consists of nine elementary schools, three middle schools, two comprehensive high schools, and one alternative high school.

It includes the majority of Pleasanton and sections of Hayward and Sunol.

High schools

Amador Valley High School

Amador Valley High School (commonly called Amador or AVHS) was founded as Amador Valley Joint Union High School. Its first class graduated in 1923. The school has been named a California Distinguished School, a National School of Character, and a National Blue Ribbon School. The school mascot is the Don.

Foothill High School

Foothill High School (FHS) was built in 1973. The current enrollment is 2,343 students. The school mascot is the falcon and its colors are yellow and blue. The official rival school is Amador Valley High School. FHS was a 2006 winner of the National Blue Ribbon Award, was a 2002 National Blue Ribbon California Nominee, and was recognized as a 2001 California Distinguished School.

Middle schools

Pleasanton Middle School
Pleasanton Middle School (PMS) is a grade 6-8 formulated middle school. The school opened in 1991, and is a California Distinguished School. Around 1300 students attend this school with 65 teachers. The school mascot is the Panther. PMS plays other schools like Harvest Park Middle School and Hart Middle School in various activities and sports, including basketball, volleyball, and wrestling. It is located next to Hearst Elementary School, and is in walking distance from the public library and downtown Pleasanton. One of the outstanding parts of the school is its cultural diversity and acceptance. From the Bhangra Club to the Model United Nations Club, there are many activities available at this middle school.

In 2020, the Black Student Union (BSU) and Latin Student Union (LSU) were created. The BSU and LSU are first ones at any middle school in Pleasanton.

In 2022, the science bowl club won 1st place at the Sandia regional science bowl. They are the first ones in district history to win this competition.

Harvest Park Middle School
Harvest Park Middle School (HPMS)  is a public middle school. It was built in 1968, and is the oldest middle school in Pleasanton. It is located at 4900 Valley Avenue. It is a National Blue Ribbon school, ranked #1 in Pleasanton for education from 2010-2013, and a California Distinguished School. It is located near Walnut Grove Elementary. offers sports such as track, volleyball, and ultimate frisbee, as well as a computer program. In track and field, the school ran at outside organization known as Oak Hill Athletics. It is one of the top rated schools in the Pleasanton area. Its mascot is the Patriot.

Thomas S. Hart Middle School
Thomas S. Hart Middle School was founded in 2000. It is the newest middle school in the district. Its mascot is the Husky. It has many sports such as ultimate frisbee, track, cross country, cricket, volleyball, golf, basketball, and color guard. The school was named after Thomas S. Hart, a well-loved teacher, principal and assistant superintendent of the Pleasanton Unified School District.

Elementary schools

Alisal
Alisal was named after the city in the 1700-1800s, before Pleasanton got its name.

Donlon
Its mascot is a cub.

Fairlands
Fairlands was built in 1969 and is located at 4151 W. Las Positas Boulevard. It has been recognized as a California Distinguished School many times. Its mascot is a "flyer" (a hot air balloon).

Hearst
Hearst Elementary School is located on Case Avenue near Pleasanton Middle School. It enrolls students from grades K-5. Its slogan is "Home of the Monarchs", and its mascot is the monarch butterfly.

Lydiksen
Lydiksen Elementary School is right off of Foothill Road, around three blocks north of Foothill High School. Built in 1967 by George C. Lydiksen, the school serves around 700 students ranging from TK (transitional kindergarten) to fifth grade. The school's mascot is the lancer, and the school has been recognized as a California Blue Ribbon school many times. Lydiksen has placed in the top 10% of all schools in California for overall test scores.

Mohr

Valley View

Is the only elementary school in Pleasanton that uses Dual Immersion Spanish. It enrolls Grades TK-5.

Vintage Hills

Walnut Grove

Continuation schools

Village High School

Village High School (commonly Village) is a public continuation high school. It was formed to serve students from Amador Valley and Foothill with low grades, multiple absences, or credit deficiencies.

References

External links

Donlon
Fairlands
Lydiksen
Mohr
Valley View
Vintage Hills
Walnut Grove

 
Education in Pleasanton, California
1988 establishments in California
School districts established in 1988